Agustín Julio Castro (born 25 October 1974) is a Colombian Association football former player, who played as a goalkeeper.

International career
Julio used to be the number one choice goalkeeper for the Colombia national football team. He had won his position after the previous first-choice keeper Miguel Calero allowed nine goals in two games. In his stint as keeper, he saved Colombia many times during the first two games of qualifiers against Brazil and Bolivia, and was referred to as San Agustín.

Julio was captain of Colombia for nine out of the first 11 qualifying games of the 2010 FIFA World Cup qualification. He had a successful start to his captaincy reign with a huge win over Argentina. However questions were raised about Julio's captaincy after a 4–0 defeat to Chile. The captaincy and Julio's place in the team were soon lost after this defeat.

However, in a shocking turnaround Agustín Julio managed to regain his place in the Colombian side in the match against Ecuador. Julio's Colombian side won the match 2–0 which took the side back into the playoff positions. Julio made a critical save in the 72nd minute of the match when Colombia when the score was still 0–0, and he managed to save a low-shot with his feet from point-blank range.

Agustin Julio remained a popular figurehead in Colombia, with fans petitioning on internet sites to re-instate Julio back in the team, and after a great performance during the first four games of qualifiers he was rated the 15th best keeper in the world.

External links
 
 
 

1974 births
Living people
Association football goalkeepers
Colombian footballers
Colombia international footballers
1999 Copa América players
Categoría Primera A players
Independiente Santa Fe footballers
Atlético Junior footballers
Once Caldas footballers
Independiente Medellín footballers
Unión Magdalena footballers
Deportes Tolima footballers
Sportspeople from Cartagena, Colombia